Mobile harassment refers to the act of sending any type of text message, sext, photo message, video message, or voicemail from a mobile phone that causes the receiver to feel harassed, threatened, tormented, humiliated, embarrassed or otherwise victimized. It is recognized as a form of cyberbullying.

Prevalence
Mobile harassment has emerged as a worldwide trend, due to the prevalence of mobile devices today. Based on recent studies, harassment through mobile texting is particularly prevalent in the United Kingdom and Australia while in the United States, the Internet is usually used. In 2009, a survey in the United Kingdom showed that approximately 14 percent of the young participants reported that they had been victims of mobile harassment, ranging from name calling, sending threatening text messages, or sending photos or videos intended to frighten or intimidate.  Another study from Queensland, Australia, suggests that number of victims could be even higher, finding that 93.7 percent of teenagers experienced mobile harassment of some kind. This study concluded that girls tend to experience—and perpetrate—more mobile bullying than boys, although the difference has been seen as minor by a 2021 study, which noted only a 1.8% increase for girls being cyberbully victims. What is clear, however, is that transgender students are cyberbullied at a rate 11.7% higher than cisgender boys and girls; conversely, transgender teenagers were shown to be the least likely to offend in such behavior, while non-heterosexual teenagers were more likely to be victims and be the offenders. Cyberbullying offending peaks at around 13 years old, but the age of victims peaks at about 14–15. Researchers also revealed that about a third of adolescents have been harassed or cyberbullied. This number could still expand, considering the fact there are still victims who do not recognize this kind of harassment or those who do not want to acknowledge it due to a sense of humiliation. 

Cases of mobile harassment often transpire outside of school; however, since the perpetrators and victims are often classmates, the harassment can spill over to the school environment.

Solutions 
Since mobile harassment is a relatively new phenomenon, there is a current lack of measures that specifically address the problem aside from generic legislation. However, schools often adopt policies and regulations that could help deter its incidence. For instance, administrators prohibit students from taking pictures and sharing visual materials within the school premises. There are also proposals that sought to completely ban the use of mobile devices in school. Waldorf Schools implement a strict anti-technology philosophy that effectively mitigates cyberbullying (at least on campus), something which has been embraced by many Silicon Valley families. The system is used in more than 1,000 institutions across 91 countries, including 136 schools in the U.S. Private organizations are also increasingly adopting their respective regulatory policies to contribute to tackling the issue. This is evident in a recent decision on the part of Facebook to adopt its own internal harassment and bullying policies. The social media company, which is cited as one of the commonly used network to harass people, also adopted measures that enable them to "remove content that appears to purposefully target private individuals with the intention of degrading or shaming them.”

Awareness

In November 2009, LG Mobile Phones released an advertising campaign in the United States that used humor to encourage teens to think before they text. The adverts were produced by DiGennaro Communications and featured James Lipton with the tagline “Before you text, give it a ponder.

In popular culture 
The television show Gossip Girl contains many episodes with storylines that revolve around gossipy, misinterpreted or questionable text messages.

References

External links
 Resources that help teens handle mobile harassment - BullyingUK
 How to Defeat Online Trolls Retrieved 2017-02-23

Cyberbullying
Internet memes
Harassment